Kim Bergman is an American psychologist, author, and surrogacy advocate. Her book Your Future Family: The Essential Guide to Assisted Reproduction was published in 2019.

Career
Bergman works in the surrogacy field, after entering the field in 1994. Prior to this she was a clinical psychologist. In 1996, she closed her practice and began work as a psychologist for the firm Growing Generations, where she is now a co-owner. At Growing Generations, Bergman has been involved in more than 1700 surrogacies, and Bergman has worked as an advocate for LGBTQ rights and civil rights legislation. She has also discussed surrogacy issues in the media.

Works
Kim Bergman's research has been published in journals including Psychology of Sexual Orientation and Gender Diversity and the Journal of GLBT Family Studies. Her book Your Future Family: The Essential Guide to Assisted Reproduction was published in 2019. The book focuses on assisted reproduction issues and provides advice to prospective parents.

Honors and awards

 2019 Hostetter-Habib Family Award by the Family Equality Council.

Personal life
Bergman and her wife Natalie have two daughters.

References

External links
 LGBTQ Parents, Don't Lie to Your Kids About Their Origins (Excerpt from Your Future Family: The Essential Guide to Assisted Reproduction) 
 Which Partner Provides the Sperm in Gay Family Planning? (Excerpt from Your Future Family: The Essential Guide to Assisted Reproduction)

Living people
American women psychologists
21st-century American psychologists
Lesbian academics
American lesbian writers
Year of birth missing (living people)
21st-century American women writers